The Dingo Creek Wine, Jazz & Blues Festival is a music festival in Australia at the Dingo Creek Vineyard at Traveston, Queensland, south of Gympie.

History and charity
David and Marg Gillespie began this festival in 2002 to commemorate what would have been their daughter, Rachel's 21st birthday, who they lost to Sudden Infant Death Syndrome (SIDS). Since then they have raised more than $70,000 for SIDS and Kids Qld as well as promote the service free of charge to all Queensland families.

With David and Marg's retirement from the Dingo Creek Jazz & Blues Festival, Gympie Rotary Club has agreed to take on the management of this event with all proceeds going to community charities and keeping with festival tradition, SIDS will be the major benefactor.

2012 performers
 Backsliders
 Band of Blue
 BSB Swing!
 Liam Burrows
 Barry Charles
 Daniel Champagne
 Cousin Alice
 Pete Cullen
 Mark Easton
 Haight Ashbury Song Show
 Lil Fi
 Wendy Matthews
 James Morrison
 John Morrison
 Navy Band
 Gregory Page
 Sassy Jazz
 The Wizard and Oz
 Zephyr Project

See also

List of blues festivals
List of festivals in Australia

References

 

Music festivals established in 2002
Jazz festivals in Australia
Blues festivals in Australia
Folk festivals in Australia
Festivals in Queensland
2002 establishments in Australia